Labeobarbus gorgorensis is a species of ray-finned fish in the genus Labeobarbus, which is endemic to Lake Tana in Ethiopia.

References 

Endemic fauna of Ethiopia
gorgorensis
Fish described in 1940
Fish of Lake Tana